Home on the Range is a 2004 American animated Western musical comedy film produced by Walt Disney Feature Animation and released by Walt Disney Pictures. The 45th Disney animated feature film, it was the last traditionally animated Disney film released until The Princess and the Frog (2009). The film was written and directed by Will Finn and John Sanford in their feature directorial debut and produced by Alice Dewey Goldstone, from a story by Finn, Sanford, Mark Kennedy, Michael LaBash, Sam Levine, and Robert Lence.

Named after the popular cowboy song of the same name, the film stars the voices of Roseanne Barr, Judi Dench, Jennifer Tilly, Cuba Gooding Jr., Randy Quaid, and Steve Buscemi. Home on the Range is set in the Old West, and centers on a mismatched trio of dairy cows—brash, adventurous Maggie; prim, proper Mrs. Calloway; and ditzy, happy-go-lucky Grace. The three cows must capture an infamous rustler named Alameda Slim for his bounty in order to save their idyllic farm from foreclosure. Aiding them in their quest is Lucky Jack, a feisty, peg-legged rabbit, and a selfish horse named Buck, eagerly working in the service of Rico, a famous bounty hunter, who seeks the glory for himself.

Home on the Range premiered at the El Capitan Theatre in Los Angeles on March 21, 2004, and was released in the United States on April 2. It received mixed reviews from critics and grossed $76.5 million at the box office.

Plot 
In the days of the Old West, Maggie is the only cow left on the Dixon Ranch after a wanted cattle rustler named Alameda Slim stole all the rest of Mr. Dixon's cattle. Dixon has no other choice than to sell Maggie to Pearl, a kind, aging woman who runs a small farm called Patch of Heaven. Sam the local Sheriff, arrives to tell Pearl that her bank is cracking down on debtors. Unless she pays the bank $750 in three days, her farm will be sold to the highest bidder. Hearing this, Maggie convinces the farm cows Grace and Mrs. Calloway to go to town to attempt to win prize money at a fair. While the cows are in town, a bounty hunter named Rico (whom Buck, the Sheriff's horse, idolizes) drops a criminal off and collects the reward. Stating he needs a replacement horse to go after Alameda Slim while his own horse rests, he takes Buck. When Maggie finds out that the reward for capturing Slim is exactly $750, she convinces the other cows to try to capture him to save Patch of Heaven.

That night, they hide among a large herd of steers, when Alameda Slim arrives with his henchmen, the Willies. Before Maggie can attack him, Slim begins a yodeling song which sends all the cattle (except Grace, who is tone deaf) into a trance that causes them to dance madly and follow him anywhere. Grace is able to bring Maggie and Mrs. Calloway back to their senses just before Slim closes the path behind him with a rock slide to stop Rico and his men from chasing him. As Rico discusses what his next move will be with his men, Buck starts to argue with the three cows. This causes Rico to believe Buck is unreliable and decides to return him to the Sheriff. Buck escapes, determined to capture Slim for himself to prove his worth.

Maggie, Grace, and Mrs. Calloway continue their search for Slim, determined to pass Buck and get to Slim first, but they have a fallout when they lose the trail in a flash flood. Mrs. Calloway argues that Maggie is going after Slim only for personal vendetta and states that Patch of Heaven would have been better off without her, to which Maggie cynically suggests they part ways. The three spend the night under a large rock. The next morning, however, they are awakened by a peg-legged jackrabbit named Lucky Jack, who has also lost his home, an old mine, to Alameda Slim. Maggie decides to go after Slim with Lucky Jack as a guide, but Grace convinces Mrs. Calloway that they help. At the mine, Slim reveals that he has been stealing all cattle from his former patrons. When his former patrons can no longer support their land, Slim buys the land when it is auctioned off, under the guise of the respectable-looking Yancy O'Dell, using the very money he gets from selling the stolen cattle.

After arriving at Slim's lair, the cows manage to trap Slim. They run off with Willies, the buyer, and Rico in pursuit. When the chase stops, Rico is revealed to be one of Slim's henchmen. Crushed by this, Buck decides to help the cows and fights Rico while setting the other cattle free. Slim dons his O'Dell costume and goes to attend the auction of Patch of Heaven. However, the cows follow by driving the cattle train locomotive to the farm. After a fight against the cows and the farm's animals, Slim is defeated, exposed and arrested, and the reward money is used to pay the farm's mortgage.

A few weeks pass, and at the county fair, most of the livestock on Patch of Heaven have won prizes. Lucky Jack moves in with Jebb the Goat, and two steers and Slim's gentlemanly steed Junior the Buffalo arrive unexpectedly to join the festivities.

Cast
Roseanne Barr as Maggie, a former show cow and the newest animal on Little Patch of Heaven farm.
Judi Dench as Mrs. Calloway, a cow who serves as the leader of the animals on the farm.
Jennifer Tilly as Grace, an optimistic and innocent-minded cow.
Cuba Gooding Jr. as Buck, a horse that dreams of being a hero.
Randy Quaid as Alameda Slim, a cattle rustler, and the film's main antagonist.
Charles Dennis as Rico, a famous bounty hunter, and Buck's idol.
Charles Haid as Lucky Jack, a clumsy rabbit with a wooden leg that he says brings good luck.
Carole Cook as Pearl Gesner, the farmer, and owner of Little Patch of Heaven.
Joe Flaherty as Jeb, a grumpy goat in Little Patch of Heaven.
Steve Buscemi as Wesley, a black market businessman who negotiates with Slim.
Richard Riehle as Sam Brown, the town sheriff, and Buck's owner.
Mark Walton as Barry and Bob, Texas longhorns.
Lance LeGault as Junior, Alameda Slim's pet buffalo.
G. W. Bailey as Rusty, Sam's dog, and Buck's friend.
Dennis Weaver as Abner Dixon, Maggie's former owner.
Patrick Warburton as Patrick, a horse that takes Rico to Slim's lair.
Estelle Harris as Audrey, a chicken in Little Patch of Heaven.
Sam J. Levine as the Willie Brothers, Slim's three nephews and henchmen.
Ann Richards as Annie, a saloon owner.

Production
Before he pitched the idea for Pocahontas, director Mike Gabriel considered adapting Western legends such as Annie Oakley, Buffalo Bill, and Pecos Bill into animated films. When he pitched both projects at the Gong Show meeting, the executives were more interested in Pocahontas, which went into production first.

When Pocahontas was finished, Gabriel went back to his Western pitch and came up with an "idea that might combine Captains Courageous with a Western." Gabriel then developed his concept into a forty-page film treatment, which was well received by then-Feature Animation president Peter Schneider. Soon after, the project, then titled Sweating Bullets, went into development. The story originated as a supernatural western about a timid cowboy who visits a ghost town and confronts an undead cattle hustler named Slim. It was later reconceived into a story about a little bull named Bullets, that wanted to be more like the horses that led the herd.

In 1999, in an attempt to salvage the production and retain the existing characters and background art, story artist Michael LaBash suggested a different approach to the story with one that involved three cow protagonists who become bounty hunters to save the farm. Building on the idea, fellow story artists Sam Levine, Mark Kennedy, Robert Lence, and Shirley Pierce developed a new storyline. However, in 2000, Mike Gabriel and co-director Mike Giaimo were removed from the project because of persistent story problems. Returning to Disney Feature Animation after The Road to El Dorado at DreamWorks Animation, Will Finn, who was originally slated to be the supervising animator on Maggie, and John Sanford were brought onboard to direct by October 2000.

Music

In February 1998, Alan Menken had signed a long-term agreement with the Walt Disney Studios to compose songs and/or scores for animated and live-action motion pictures. Following this, according to Menken, he was attached to provide music for Sweating Bullets "maybe a year and a half after Hercules". Shortly after winning the ASCAP/Richard Rodgers New Horizons Award, lyricist Glenn Slater was brought to the attention of Menken, who later invited Slater to work with him on Sweating Bullets.

Together, they wrote the first of the film's six original songs back in 1999; the first of which was "Little Patch of Heaven" recorded by k.d. lang before Finn and Sanford were brought on board as directors. The villain song "Yodel-Adle-Eedle-Idle-Oo," which incorporates the "William Tell Overture," Beethoven's Ninth Symphony, and the "1812 Overture" into the yodel dance, was added following several story changes throughout production. Randy Quaid did sing much of “Yodel-Adle-Eedle-Idle-Oo,” including the consonants heard during the yodels, but vowel sounds in the yodeling were overdubbed from ghost singers Randy Erwin and Kerry Christianson, two world champion yodelers. Following the September 11 attacks, Menken composed the song "Will the Sun Ever Shine Again" in reaction, which was performed by Bonnie Raitt.

The soundtrack album of the film was released on March 30, 2004 by Walt Disney Records. It contains vocal songs performed by k.d. lang, Randy Quaid, Bonnie Raitt, Tim McGraw, and The Beu Sisters along with the film's score composed by Alan Menken.

Songs
Original songs performed in the film include:

Release
Home on the Range was scheduled for a 2003 release, while Brother Bear was originally slated for a spring 2004 release. However, Disney announced that the release dates were switched with both movies. Contrary to speculation, news writer Jim Hill stated the release date switch was not because Home on the Range was suffering from story rewrites, but to promote Brother Bear on the Platinum Edition release of The Lion King.

Home media
Home on the Range was released on VHS and DVD on September 14, 2004. The DVD came with an animated short featuring the film's voice cast and animated intros to the DVD menu featuring the same cast. It was released on Blu-ray on July 3, 2012.

Reception

Critical reception
 On Metacritic, the film has a score of 50 out of 100, based on 30 critics, indicating "mixed or average" reviews. Audiences polled by CinemaScore gave the film an average grade of "A–" on an A+ to F scale.

Nathan Rabin, reviewing for The A.V. Club, praised the film describing it as "a sweet, raucously funny, comic Western that corrects a glaring historical injustice by finally surveying the Old West through the eyes of cows rather than cowboys." Roger Ebert of the Chicago Sun-Times gave the film 2.5 stars out of 4, saying that "A movie like this is fun for kids: bright, quick-paced, with broad, outrageous characters. But Home on the Range doesn't have the crossover quality of the great Disney films like Beauty and the Beast and The Lion King. And it doesn't have the freshness and originality of a more traditional movie like Lilo & Stitch. Its real future, I suspect, lies in home video. It's only 76 minutes long, but although kids will like it, their parents will be sneaking looks at their watches." Claudia Puig of USA Today wrote favorably in her review that "Home on the Range is a throwback to old Disney cartoons: fun, rather than message-laden, with broad humor and entertaining action. The cheerful, plucky characters have heart and loyalty, and that's enough to make this a worthy family-friendly animated fest." Nell Minow of Common Sense Media gave the film four out of five stars, saying that "I love it when Disney doesn't take itself too seriously. No one tried to reach for the stars or make this into a classic. Home on the Range is just a cute little story about some not-so-contented cows who save the day. It modestly aspires to be nothing more than a lot of fun, and it does that job very well.

Elvis Mitchell of The New York Times criticized the weak comedy writing that "Unrestrained energy is hardly a bad thing for animation — the best cartoons are built on the contradictory pursuit of meticulously arranged anarchy—but they never seem needy, or desperate for laughs, as Home on the Range does. The film seems hungrier for a pat on the head than a chuckle." Similarly, Los Angeles Times film critic Kenneth Turan claimed "Home on the Range may be acceptable on reflection, but its formulaic desire to mix wisecracks for adults with pratfalls for kids is feeling thin, and its overall air of frantic hysteria does not wear well either." Michael Wilmington of The Chicago Tribune noted "Satirizing the movie Western can make for a great cartoon, as it does in Jiri Trnka's brilliant 1949 Czech short Song of the Prairie, a puppet version of Stagecoach. But Home isn't good satire or good slapstick. It does have those lyrical, catchy Menken tunes, and the film perks up whenever Raitt or lang sing one of them. But much of this movie is deadly. Home keeps milking the same gags and throwing the same bull, and after a while you feel cowed watching it."

Box office
On its opening box office weekend, Home on the Range grossed about $14 million in box office estimates, opening fourth behind Scooby Doo 2: Monsters Unleashed, Walking Tall, and Hellboy. Following the disappointing box office weekend, financial analysts predicted that Disney would be forced to have write-down the production costs, which totaled more than $100 million. Following the latter release of The Alamo, which also met poor box office returns, it was reported that Disney would have to write-down about $70 million. The film ended its box office run with $50 million in domestic earnings and $76.5 million worldwide.

Accolades

References

External links

Home on the Range at UltimateDisney.com

2004 animated films
2004 comedy films
2004 directorial debut films
2004 Western (genre) films
2000s American animated films
2000s children's animated films
2000s English-language films
2000s buddy comedy films
2000s musical comedy films
2000s female buddy films
2000s Western (genre) comedy films
American buddy comedy films
American children's animated comedy films
American children's animated musical films
American female buddy films
American Western (genre) comedy films
American Western (genre) musical films
Animated buddy films
Animated films about animals
Animated films about friendship
Animated films about trains
Films about cattle
Films about hypnosis
Films directed by Will Finn
Films directed by John Sanford
Films scored by Alan Menken
Films set in 1889
Films set on farms
Films with screenplays by Will Finn
Game Boy Advance games
Walt Disney Animation Studios films
Walt Disney Pictures animated films
Western (genre) animated films